Sticky rice mortar was invented in ancient China utilizing organic materials in inorganic mortar. Hydraulic mortar was not available in ancient China, possibly due to a lack of volcanic ash.

Around 500 CE, sticky rice soup was mixed with slaked lime to make an inorganic−organic composite mortar that had more strength and water resistance than lime mortar. Sticky rice played a major role in maintaining the durability of the  Great Wall, as well as tombs, pagodas, and city walls. Sticky rice mortar had high adhesive strength, sturdiness, waterproofing capability, and prevented weeds from growing as crude mortar made of sticky rice and burnt lime created a seal between bricks that would rival modern cement in strength.

During the Ming dynasty (1368–1644 AD), brick-making techniques improved significantly in terms of quantity and quality of production. Since then, Great Wall sections were widely built with bricks, with lime mortar and sticky rice used to reinforce the bricks strongly enough to resist earthquakes and modern bulldozers while keeping the building intact.

Modern chemists, through their research, identified amylopectin, a type of polysaccharide, or complex carbohydrate, found in rice and other starchy foods to appear to be responsible for the sticky rice mortar's strength and durability.

References

Bricks
Building materials
Cement
Chinese inventions
Concrete
Great Wall of China
Rice
Traditional East Asian Architecture